Adam Maxted (born 27 March 1992) is a Northern Irish professional wrestler and former contestant on ITV2 show Love Island. Having been a contestant on Series two of Love Island, having entered at day 11, Maxted paired up with Katie Salmon and finished the series in fourth position.

Love Island
In 2016, Maxted was selected to be a part of the second series of ITV's Love Island; where he appeared from the 11th day, until the end, selecting fellow contestant Katie Salmon as his date. The pair ended the series in fourth place, behind eventual winners, Nathan and Cara.

Professional wrestling career

Early career (2016–2017)
Maxted left Love Island and continued his wrestling training, eventually earning his debut match in August 2016, at Southside Wrestling, being defeated by Joseph Connors. Maxted later had matches for Preston City Wrestling, Over the Top Wrestling, and 4 Front Wrestling, in 2017. In May 2017, Maxted was called up to have his first WWE Tryout, in the O2 Arena.

Maxted had his first championship matches, competing for the All-Ulster Title and challenging Josh Knott for the Pro Wrestling Pride Catch Division Championship. He then made trips to France, and Pakistan, where he challenged for the PWE World Heavyweight Title. In November 2017, Maxted won the IPW:UK All England Championship, defeating Earl-Black Junior.

In 2018, after signing for 5 Star Wrestling, he appeared on FreeSports, where he and Charlie Sterling won the 5* Tag Team Championship.

World of Sport (2018)
On 4 August 2018, he made his debut for World of Sport, teaming up with Nathan Cruz to take on Doug Williams and HT Drake in the WOS Tag Team Title Tournament. Maxted and Cruz went on to defeat the team of Grado and Davey Boy Smith Jr. to advance to the finals, however they we're unsuccessful to become the 1st Tag Team Champions, losing the final to Kip Sabian and Lestyn Rees. Nathan Cruz then betrayed Maxted shortly after. On 24 August, episode 5, Maxted defeated Cruz in a Ladder Match, which who ever loses must leave WOS forever.

Over The Top Wrestling (2016-Present)
Adam Maxted debuted for Irish promotion Over The Top Wrestling in 2016. He is the current co-holder of the OTT Tag Team Championship. Maxted also holds the record for longest reigning OTT Gender Neutral with his tenure lasting 560 days.

Personal life
Following Love Island, Maxted entered into a relationship with fitness instructor Carly Taylor.

Championships and accomplishments 
 5 Star Wrestling
 5 Star Wrestling: Tag Team Championship (1 time) - with Charlie Sterling
 Big League Wrestling
 BLW World Heavyweight Championship (1 time, current)
 BLW Tag Team Championship (1 time) - with Chris Andrews
 Frontline Wrestling
 Frontline Heavyweight Championship (1 time, current)
	International Pro Wrestling United Kingdom 
All England Championship (1 time)
 Ironfist Wrestling
 Ironfist Heavyweight Championship (1 time)
 King Of The Ironfist Tournament (2019)
 Main Event Wrestling
 MEW Heavyweight Championship (3 times, current)
 New Breed Wrestling Association
 NBWA Heavyweight Championship (1 time)
 Over the Top Wrestling
 OTT Gender Neutral Championship (1 time)
 OTT Tag Team Championship (1 time, current) - with Charlie Sterling
Southside Wrestling Entertainment
SWE European Championship (1 time)

References

External links
Adam Maxted on Cagematch
Adam Maxted on Facebook

1981 births
Living people
Sportspeople from Belfast
Male professional wrestlers from Northern Ireland
Love Island (2015 TV series) contestants